Jangji station is a subway station in Jangji-dong, Songpa-gu, which is located in Seoul, South Korea. This station is on Seoul Subway Line 8.

Jangji is mostly a bed town, with numerous apartments, including the "Songpa Pine Town". The Garden 5, a shopping mall with a movie theater, spa, etc., is next to exit 5.

Station layout

Metro stations in Songpa District
Seoul Metropolitan Subway stations
Railway stations opened in 1996